Susanne Stadlmüller (born 1 September 1984 in Sindelfingen, West Germany) is a German former figure skater. She is the 2000 and 2001 German national champion.

Programs

Competitive highlights
GP: Grand Prix; JGP: Junior Grand Prix

References

 JGP 1999 / 2000 NED http://www.eiskunstlauf-ecke.de/archiv/1999-00/jgp99_04.shtml
 JGP 1999 / 2000 SWE http://www.eiskunstlauf-ecke.de/archiv/1999-00/jgp99_06.shtml
 JGP 1998 / 1999 UKR http://www.eiskunstlauf-ecke.de/archiv/1998-99/eukrso98.shtml

External links
 
 Susanne Stadlmüller at Tracings.net

1984 births
Living people
People from Sindelfingen
Sportspeople from Stuttgart (region)
German female single skaters